The Cabinet of Kuwait is the chief executive body of the State of Kuwait. The 40th cabinet in the history of Kuwait was appointed on 1 August 2022. On 24 July 2022, Amir of Kuwait His Highness Sheikh Nawaf Al-Ahmad Al-Jaber Al-Sabah assigned His Highness Sheikh Ahmad Nawaf Al-Ahmad Al-Sabah as Prime Minister. The Amir has also assigned the Prime Minister to refer the cabinet line-up for their appointment. On 1 August 2022, the new cabinet line-up was announced after the Amir approved in an Amiri order. On 2 October 2022, the Prime Minister tendered a letter of governmental resignation to the Crown Prince. The government will function as care-taker until the formation of the new government.

Cabinets established in 2022
Cabinets of Kuwait